Saint Seiya: Sanctuary Battle, known in Japan as , is a video game for the PlayStation 3, inspired by the characters appearing in Masami Kurumada's Saint Seiya manga and its anime adaptation. The game was released in November 2011 in Japan, followed by a PAL region release in March 2012. The game is inspired by the first season of the original anime, the Sanctuary Battle, in which Seiya and his friends have the task of fighting the 12 Gold Saints to save Saori Kido from dying.

Reception

The game received "mixed" reviews according to the review aggregation website Metacritic. In Japan, Famitsu gave it a score of all four eights for a total of 32 out of 40.

References

External links
 Official website

2011 video games
Beat 'em ups
Video games based on mythology
Action-adventure games
Saint Seiya video games
Dimps games
Bandai Namco games
PlayStation 3 games
PlayStation 3-only games
Video games based on Greek mythology
Video games developed in Japan
Video games scored by Yoshitaka Hirota
Multiplayer and single-player video games